Raúl Gracia Guzmán (born 20 February 1975) is a Mexican politician affiliated with the PAN. He is a Deputy during the LXIV Legislature of the Mexican Congress. He served as Senator of the LXII Legislature of the Mexican Congress representing Nuevo León. He also served as Deputy during LVIII Legislature.

References

1975 births
Living people
Politicians from Monterrey
Members of the Senate of the Republic (Mexico)
Members of the Chamber of Deputies (Mexico)
National Action Party (Mexico) politicians
21st-century Mexican politicians
University of Monterrey alumni
Senators of the LXII and LXIII Legislatures of Mexico